The Kareeya Hydro Power Station near Tully in Queensland, Australia in a hydroelectric power station that began generating power in 1957. The power station is owned by CleanCo Queensland.

Taking its name from the Aboriginal word meaning 'big water', the Kareeya Hydro project originally comprised construction of Koombooloomba Dam, the Tully Falls Weir and Kareeya Hydro power station. A dam was needed for water storage because most of the rain in the area falls in the first few months of the year. An intake tower is located in the weir, which directs water down a tunnel to the turbines in an underground power station below Tully Falls.

Planning for the project began in 1949 and it was intended to be operating by 1955. Construction of a diversion tunnel started in early 1952. The 132 Kv transmission line was the first ever constructed in Queensland and the state's first use of steel towers for electricity distribution. The last of the four generating sets was installed by mid-1959.

The power station's staff and families were provided accommodation in a small village, named Cardstone, located downstream from the plant.

Upgrade
The power station was upgraded between 2005 and 2008. This has effectively extended the life of the power station by 25 years and increased capacity, generation, efficiency and availability.

See also

List of active power stations in Queensland

References

Energy infrastructure completed in 1957
Hydroelectric power stations in Queensland
Buildings and structures in Far North Queensland
Underground power stations
1957 establishments in Australia